Garbatka-Letnisko  (Letnisko means summer resort) is a village in Kozienice County, Masovian Voivodeship, in east-central Poland. It is the seat of the gmina (administrative district) called Gmina Garbatka-Letnisko.

History
At the present location of Garbatka-Letnisko there were two villages, Garbatka and Rambertów (variously spelled: Rembiertów, Rambertów, Rembertów), until the 15th century.

The first mention of Garbatka in written sources are from 1449. However, there are key references in the "liberum beneficjorum" III 267 Jan Długosz, in documents from the years 1497 and 1542. At that time, Garbatka belonged to the Szliz family, and at the turn of the 15th and 16th century passed into possession of the Kochanowski house. In the 16th century, both the villages, Rambertów and Garbatka were linked.

In 1787, Garbatka had 253 inhabitants, in 1881 715 inhabitants and 101 houses.

In the period 1795-1809 Garbatka is under Austrian partition, while in the years 1815–1915 in Russian partition.

The most important years in the history of Garbatka was the interwar period. Then Garbatka became famous as a summer resort. Visited by crowds of tourists, particularly from Radom, Lublin and Warsaw. At that time there were about 400 houses for rent. Houses already built on both sides of the track. Thanks to the local air treatment walorom, many people changed their lives dramatically. In the year 1921 Garbatka had already 1,739 residents, reflecting the strong development of the village.

See also 
 Garbatka (disambiguation)

References

Sources

External links
 
 
 
 

Villages in Kozienice County
Radom Governorate
Kielce Voivodeship (1919–1939)